Margaret of Flanders may refer to:

Margaret I, Countess of Flanders (c. 1145 – 15 November 1194)
Margaret II, Countess of Flanders (1202 – 10 February 1280), also Countess of Hainaut, often called Margaret of Constantinople
Margaret III, Countess of Flanders (13 April 1350 – 16/21 March 1405) also countess of Artois and Burgundy, wife of Philip I, Duke of Burgundy, and later wife of Philip the Bold
Margaret of Flanders, Duchess of Brabant (c. 1253 – 3 July 1285), wife of John I, Duke of Brabant
Margaret of Flanders, Countess of Guelders, wife of Prince Alexander of Scotland (son of Alexander III of Scotland) and later wife of Reinald I van Gelre